Chunar stone or Red-spotted sandstone is a kind of reddish or buff-colored, finely grained, hard sandstone quarried in the Chunar in the Mirzapur District of Uttar Pradesh, and widely used in the architecture of India.

Background
Notable buildings and monuments carved from chunar stone include:

 Pillars of Ashoka.
 St. Paul's Cathedral, Kolkata.

References

Building stone